Artlist Collection: The Dog and Friends (better known as The Dog and Friends or simply The Dog) is a franchise created by Artlist in Japan in 2000. Initially known as Artlist Collection: The Dog, the franchise began as collection of calendars and postcards of dogs photographed with a fisheye lens. Afterwards, the franchise became so popular that new animals such as cats, pigs, rabbits, ducks, hamsters, and birds were added to the collection. In 2003, 4Kids Entertainment bought the rights for this franchise outside of Asia. In 2004, to celebrate 25 years of the McDonald's Happy Meal, toys of this franchise were sold as Happy Meals from April 2 to April 29. Select locations featured dog adoption events. They were sold once again the next year, but with "The Cat" plushes. In 2006, the series introduced its first video game, The Dog: Happy Life. The game was released exclusively in Japan. It was followed up by a 2007 adventure game, The Dog Island. In 2009, the series also released a pet simulation game on mobile phones and smart phones. In 2016, they were featured as themes for the Japanese Nintendo 3DS home menu.

References

External links
Official website

Mass media franchises introduced in 2000
2000s toys
Fictional cats
Fictional dogs
Fictional ducks
Fictional hamsters
Fictional rabbits and hares
Fictional pigs
Stuffed toys
Toy animals
Toy brands